Sabine Everts (born 4 March 1961) is a former West German heptathlete.

Biography
She won a bronze medal at the 1980 European Indoor Championships and the gold medal at the 1982 European Indoor Championships in the long jump. She then won bronze medals in the heptathlon at the 1982 European Championships and the 1984 Summer Olympic Games.

Everts was ranked world #2 in 1981 and #4 in 1982 in the heptathlon, she was world #7 in the long jump in 1982. Domestically she won 22 national titles, and was awarded the Silver Bay Leaf of the German Track and Field Association in 1981.

Sabine Everts is married to athletics coach Hans-Jörg Thomaskamp. They have two sons.

References

1961 births
Living people
West German heptathletes
West German female hurdlers
Athletes (track and field) at the 1984 Summer Olympics
Athletes (track and field) at the 1988 Summer Olympics
Olympic athletes of West Germany
Olympic bronze medalists for West Germany
Sportspeople from Düsseldorf
European Athletics Championships medalists
Medalists at the 1984 Summer Olympics
Olympic bronze medalists in athletics (track and field)
Universiade medalists in athletics (track and field)
World Athletics Championships athletes for West Germany
Universiade silver medalists for West Germany
Medalists at the 1983 Summer Universiade
West German female long jumpers